In biological taxonomy, a  (abbreviation:  plural abbreviation) is a new species. The phrase is Latin, and is used after a binomial name that is being published for the first time.

An example is the species of miniature frog, Paedophryne amauensis, originally described as Paedophryne amauensis sp. nov. in PLOS ONE in 2012.

See also 
 Glossary of scientific naming
 Species description

References 

Botanical nomenclature
Zoological nomenclature